Stephen Conroy or Steve Conroy may refer to:
 Steve Conroy (footballer) (1956–2021), English goalkeeper
 Stephen Conroy (born 1963), Australian politician
 Stephen Conroy (artist) (born 1964), Scottish figurate painter
 Steve Conroy (referee) (born 1966), Scottish football referee